, better known as , is a Japanese entertainer and race queen who is represented by the talent agency, Platinum Production.

Ono is nicknamed .

Biography
On 2012, Ono started entertainment activities while belonged to Platinum Production. She managed her resume in a coming-of-age ceremony.

On 2013, Ono does race queen activities as a member of Super GT's Zent Sweeties.

On 2014, she became the image model of Tokyo Auto Salon's "A-class". After that, Ono would like to concentrate on the entertainer industry without working as a race queen.

On 2015, her first film appearance was in Ju-On: The Final Curse.

On September 9, 2020, she announced that she is officially married with an Olympic swimmer, Shinri Shioura.

On May 27, 2021, Ono announced that she was pregnant with her first child. On October 29, she gave birth to a healthy baby girl.

.

Filmography

Race queen/Image girl

TV series
Regular appearances

Other appearances

Drama

Films

Radio series
Regular appearances

Guest appearances

Advertisements

Gravure activities

Events

References

External links
Official profile 
 

Japanese television personalities
Japanese gravure idols
1991 births
Living people
People from Tokyo